Rob Rensenbrink (3 July 1947 – 24 January 2020) was a Dutch footballer and member of the Netherlands national team that reached two World Cup finals in 1974 and 1978. A creative and prolific left winger or forward, he became a legend in Belgium whilst playing in the great Anderlecht side of the 1970s. He is the UEFA Cup Winners Cup's all-time top scorer, with 25 goals. A talented dribbler as well as a cool finisher and adequate passer, he only ever missed two penalties in his entire career. He was also the first winner of the Onze d'Or.

Club career 
Born in Amsterdam, Rensenbrink started his career at DWS, an Amsterdam amateur club, before moving to Belgian side Club Brugge in 1969. Between 1971 and 1980 he played for Anderlecht where he enjoyed his greatest club successes. In total when in Belgium he twice won the Belgian Championships, the Belgian Cup five times and at European club level the European Cup Winners' Cup twice (in 1976 and 1978 as well as being runner-up in 1977). Rensenbrink delivered a notable performance in the 1976 final as Anderlecht ran out 4–2 winners against West Ham United. He scored two goals, one from the penalty spot and set up Francois Van der Elst for the fourth goal. Among his team mates was Dutch internationalist compatriot, Arie Haan. In 1980, he left Anderlecht and wound down his career with a spell at Portland Timbers in the NASL, followed by a brief stay with Toulouse in France in 1981.

International career 
Rensenbrink made his international debut for the Netherlands national football team against Scotland in 1968, but picked up relatively few caps due to competition for the forward positions with Johan Cruijff and Piet Keizer. However, Rinus Michels included him for the 1974 FIFA World Cup squad that made the short trip to West Germany.

The Dutch side that took part in the 1974 FIFA World Cup were the pinnacle of Total Football. Most of the 1974 team were made up of players from AFC Ajax and Feyenoord, so Rensenbrink was an outsider and was unfamiliar with playing the system.  His preferred position was up front on the left, but that position was already Johan Cruijff's domain, so he played on the left-wing position in midfield, taking over from Ajax player Piet Keizer. He missed one game in the tournament (when Keizer played instead) and was only half-fit for the final after picking up an injury during the semi-final against Brazil. Rinus Michels gambled on Rensenbrink's fitness and played him from start – however he only lasted until half-time and was replaced by René van de Kerkhof. The Netherlands took an early lead through a Johan Neeskens penalty, but goals from Paul Breitner and Gerd Müller gave West Germany a 2–1 victory. Rensenbrink's performances saw him named to the team of the tournament and he was sought by Ajax as a replacement for Keizer. However, contract negotiations fell through and he remained at Anderlecht.

Rensenbrink stayed in the Netherlands national team during the qualifiers and finals of the 1976 European Football Championship. However, the Netherlands fell at the semi-final stage to Czechoslovakia.

In the 1978 FIFA World Cup tournament in Argentina, the Netherlands again reached the final, but this time without Cruijff (who decided to retire from international football) and under the guidance of Ernst Happel rather than Michels. Out of the shadow of Cruijff, Rensenbrink found more room to showcase his own considerable talent, playing on the left-hand side of a front three alongside Johnny Rep and René van de Kerkhof. He scored a hat-trick in the opening game against Iran, another goal against Scotland which was goal number 1000 in World Cup history and a penalty in the 5–1 win over Austria. In the final against Argentina, the Netherlands yet again met the hosts. In an intense match, the Netherlands fell behind to a first-half Mario Kempes strike. After Dick Nanninga's equalizer 9 minutes from time, a long pass from the Dutch captain Ruud Krol in the last 30 seconds of normal time gave Rensenbrink a half-chance to score but his shot from a very narrow angle was deflected on to the post and bounced clear. Had he scored, it is almost certain that Holland would have won the World Cup with Rensenbrink being top goal scorer. Argentina scored twice in extra-time for a 3–1 victory and the Netherlands again had to settle for the runners-up spot.

Rensenbrink played some of the qualifiers for Euro 80, but after earning his 46th cap in 1979 (a 2–0 defeat by Poland in a qualifier for Euro 80), he retired from international football at the age of 32, having scored 14 times for his country. He along with Eusébio are the only players to score the most goals from a penalty spot in a tournament (4 in 1978).

He was named by Pelé as one of the top 125 greatest living footballers in March 2004. He was also named Anderlecht's  greatest ever foreign player in 2008.

Personal life 
Rensenbrink was married and lived in Oostzaan. In the summer of 2015, he revealed that he had been diagnosed with progressive muscular atrophy three years earlier. He died on 24 January 2020. Belgian news sources reported that he had been diagnosed with a muscular disease in 2012 which led to his death.

Career statistics

Club

International

Honours 

Club Brugge
Belgian Cup: 1969–70

Anderlecht
Belgian First Division: 1971–72, 1973–74
Belgian Cup: 1971–72, 1972–73, 1974–75, 1975–76
Belgian League Cup: 1973, 1974
European Cup Winners' Cup: 1975–76, 1977–78; runner-up: 1976–77
Amsterdam Tournament: 1976
European Super Cup: 1976, 1978
Tournoi de Paris: 1977
Jules Pappaert Cup: 1977
Belgian Sports Merit Award: 1978

Toulouse
Division 2: 1981–82

Netherlands
FIFA World Cup: runner-up 1974, 1978
UEFA European Football Championship: third place 1976

Individual
Belgian First Division top scorer: 1972–73
FIFA World Cup All-Star Team: 1974, 1978
European Cup Winners' Cup top scorer: 1975–76
IOC European Footballer of the Season: 1975–76
Belgian Golden Shoe: 1976
Onze d'Or: 1976
Ballon d'Or: runner-up 1976, third place 1978
Onze de Onze: 1976, 1977, 1978, 1979
FIFA World Cup Bronze Boot: 1978
FIFA World Cup Most Assists: 1978
Onze de Bronze: 1978, 1979
France Football's World Cup Top-100 1930-1990 46th: 1994
Planète Foot's 50 of the World's Best Players: 1996
FIFA 100: 2004
Placar's 100 World Cup Stars 42nd: 2005
Best foreign player in the Belgian First Division of all time: 2007
Best RSC Anderlecht player of all time: 2008
The Best Golden Shoe Team: 2011
UEFA Cup Winners' Cup All-time top scorer: (25 goals)
Scorer of the 1000th World Cup goal
DH The Best RSC Anderlecht Team Ever: 2020

References

External links 

 Portland Timbers stats
 

1947 births
2020 deaths
FIFA 100
Dutch footballers
Footballers from Amsterdam
Association football wingers
Association football forwards
Netherlands international footballers
Eredivisie players
Belgian Pro League players
North American Soccer League (1968–1984) players
Ligue 2 players
AFC DWS players
Club Brugge KV players
R.S.C. Anderlecht players
Portland Timbers (1975–1982) players
Toulouse FC players
1974 FIFA World Cup players
UEFA Euro 1976 players
1978 FIFA World Cup players
Expatriate footballers in Belgium
Expatriate footballers in France
Expatriate soccer players in the United States
Dutch expatriate sportspeople in Belgium
Dutch expatriate sportspeople in France
Dutch expatriate sportspeople in the United States
Neurological disease deaths in the Netherlands
Deaths from motor neuron disease